Richmond Ayi (born 4 June 1997) is a Ghanaian professional footballer who plays as a goalkeeper for Ghanaian Premier league side Accra Hearts of Oak.

Career 
Ayi started his football career with Bono Region-based division one club Techiman City FC. He featured for the club in the 2016 Ghanaian Premier League. He later moved to Volta Region-based West African Football Academy (WAFA) in 2017 and after spending 2 seasons with WAFA he then moved to Accra Hearts of Oak in 2019.

International career 
Ayi played for the Ghana national under-23 football team from 2018 to 2019. He was a member of the squad that featured for Ghana at the 2019 Africa U-23 Cup of Nations.

Honours 
Hearts of Oak

 Ghana Premier League: 2020–21
Ghanaian FA Cup: 2021

References

External links 

 

Living people
1997 births
West African Football Academy players
Association football goalkeepers
Accra Hearts of Oak S.C. players
Ghanaian footballers
Ghana Premier League players
Techiman City FC players